Ella Aleksandrovna Pamfilova (born 12 September 1953) is a Russian politician, former deputy of the State Duma, candidate for president in 2000 and former chairman (2004 - 2010) of the Presidential Council for Civil Society and Human Rights. On 18 March 2014 she became Russia's Commissioner for Human Rights, succeeding Vladimir Lukin. On 28 March 2016 she became the chair of the Central Election Commission.

Biography
Pamfilova started her career on the central repair and engineering works in Moscow as an engineer. She was also the first woman to head the country's state controlled pet food company "Belka," which she oversaw from 1984 to 1986. She went on to become a People's Deputy of the USSR and member of Supreme Soviet of the Soviet Union.

During the period 1991 until 1994, she led The Ministry of Social Care under President Boris Yeltsin. Between 1994 and 1999, Pamfilova was elected three times as member of the State Duma.

In 2000 she was the first woman to run as a candidate in a Russian presidential election campaign. However, she faced stiff competition from Yabloko leader Grigory Yavlinsky for the liberal vote, and her share of the vote was very low.

Since 2004 she has been a head of Vladimir Putin's Human Right Commission.

At the State Duma session of October 7, 2009 an MP from United Russia, Robert Shlegel, proposed that the president dismiss Pamfilova from the Human Rights Commission for advocating Alexander Podrabinek's rights. The watchdog, led by Pamfilova, had called the protests “a persecution campaign … organized by irresponsible adventurists from Nashi” and said the activists were showing open signs of extremism.

Sanctions
In December 2022 the USA imposed sanctions on Ella Pamfilova.

In January 2023 Ella Pamfilova was sanctioned by Japan in relation to the 2022 Russian invasion of Ukraine

References

External links

Web-site of the Council on Civil Society Institutions and Human Rights
Web-site of the Civil G8

1953 births
21st-century Russian women politicians
Living people
Members of election commissions
Soviet politicians
Soviet women in politics
Pamfilova
Pamfilova
Ombudsmen in Russia
Moscow Power Engineering Institute alumni
First convocation members of the State Duma (Russian Federation)
Second convocation members of the State Duma (Russian Federation)

Anti-Ukrainian sentiment in Russia